Henrietta Alexandrine Friederike Wilhelmine of Nassau-Weilburg, then of Nassau (areas now part of Germany) (30 October 1797 Palace Eremitage, Bayreuth – 29 December 1829, Vienna) was the wife of Archduke Charles, Duke of Teschen. Her husband was a notable general of the Napoleonic Wars and victor of the Battle of Aspern-Essling against Napoleon I of France.

Family

Henrietta was the youngest daughter of Frederick William of Nassau-Weilburg (1768–1816) and his wife Burgravine Louise Isabelle of Kirchberg. Her paternal grandparents were Karl Christian of Nassau-Weilburg and Princess Wilhelmine Carolina of Orange-Nassau.

Wilhelmine Carolina was a daughter of William IV, Prince of Orange and Anne, Princess Royal. Anne was in turn the eldest daughter of George II of Great Britain and Caroline of Ansbach.

Marriage

On 15 September/17 September 1815 in Weilburg, Henrietta married Archduke Charles of Austria. The bride was almost eighteen years old and the groom forty-four. Her husband was a son of Leopold II, Holy Roman Emperor and Maria Louisa of Spain. However he had been adopted and raised by his childless aunt Marie Christine of Austria and her husband Albert of Saxe-Teschen. He was the heir to the Duchy of Teschen and would succeed in 1822. This marriage was a very happy one.

She has been known as the person who popularized the christmas tree in Vienna after it was already introduced by Fanny von Arnstein in 1814 during the Vienna Congress.

Henrietta died young of scarlet fever, which she had caught while nursing her children through the same illness. She is the only Protestant buried in the Imperial Crypt in the Capuchin Church.  This was allowed by order of her brother-in-law Emperor Francis I, who said, "She dwelt among us when she was alive, and so she shall in death".

Henrietta and Charles had seven children.

Issue

Ancestry

References

External links

 

1797 births
1829 deaths
People from Bayreuth
House of Nassau-Weilburg
House of Habsburg-Lorraine
Duchesses of Teschen
Austrian princesses
Austrian Protestants
Princesses of Nassau-Weilburg
Burials at the Imperial Crypt
Daughters of monarchs